Invincible Shaolin (Nan Shao Lin yu bei Shao Lin) a.k.a. Unbeatable Dragon is a 1978 Shaw Brothers kung fu film directed by Chang Cheh. It is one of Chang Cheh's tales of Shaolin's historic rivalries with the Qing Dynasty. It is one of the few Venom films featuring Wei Pai (the Snake).

Plot 
An evil Qing general (Wong Lung Wei) comes up with a brilliant plan to rid the Qing Empire once and for all of the Shaolin masters. He invites three Northern Shaolin experts to his mansion and has them fight in a contest against three novice Southern Shaolin men already present at his mansion. By royal decree, Shaolin was required to supply experts to teach the Qing troops martial arts. The Northern Shaolin experts easily and decisively win against the South Shaolin men. After the contest, the general visits the South Shaolin men in their quarters later that night and secretly kills the Southerners. He then has his subordinate go to South Shaolin placing the blame squarely on the Northerners. The Southern master of the dead disciples is deceived into believing that the Northern experts killed his disciples. This would begin an internal conflict between both Shaolin schools. It is only when the South Shaolin experts have their final confrontation with the Northerners that the general reveals himself. The experts from both schools realize they have been deceived and manipulated. Joining forces both North and South experts battle the general and his troops to allow some of their fellows to escape and reveal the Qing plot to destroy Shaolin.

External links 
 
 

1978 films
1978 martial arts films
1970s martial arts films
Hong Kong martial arts films
Shaw Brothers Studio films
Kung fu films
1970s Mandarin-language films
Films directed by Chang Cheh
Funimation
Films set in 17th-century Qing dynasty
Shaolin Temple in film
1970s Hong Kong films